Scott D. Anthony is an author and senior partner at growth strategy consulting firm Innosight.

Biography
Anthony has advised senior leaders in organizations like Procter & Gamble, Johnson & Johnson, General Electric, LG, Credit Suisse, Cisco Systems, Ayala Group, and the Singapore Economic Development Board. Anthony leads Innosight's venture-capital investing activities (Innosight Ventures). He also chairs the investment committee for IDEAS Ventures, a SGD 10 million fund Innosight runs in conjunction with the Singapore government. In 2009, he joined the Board of Directors of Media General.

Anthony has written extensively about a number of innovation topics including disruptive innovation and business transformation. Most recently, Scott is the coauthor of the new book Dual Transformation: How to Reposition Today’s Business While Creating the Future, a blueprint for how successful companies can leverage disruptive change to fortify today’s business and create tomorrow’s growth engine.

His passion is in enabling innovators around the world to realize their untapped potential.  He is the author of Harvard Business Review article "The New Corporate Garage," and co-author of the Harvard Business Review article "How P&G Tripled Its Innovation Success Rate" with Bruce Brown, P&G chief technology officer.  He is also the author of The Little Black Book of Innovation, published by Harvard Business Press in January 2012 and author of The Silver Lining, published by Harvard Business Press in June 2009. He co-authored Seeing What's Next with Harvard Business School Professor and Innosight cofounder Clayton M. Christensen and was the lead author of The Innovator's Guide to Growth. He has written articles for publications such as Wall Street Journal, Harvard Business Review, BusinessWeek, Forbes, Sloan Management Review, Advertising Age, Marketing Management and Chief Executive, and serves as a judge in the Wall Street Journal's Innovation Awards.  He has appeared on Good Morning America, CNBC, and FOX Business.  He also has a regular column at Harvard Business Online.  In 2017, Anthony received the Thinkers50 Distinguished Achievement award for his work in the field of innovation.

Anthony received a BA in economics summa cum laude from Dartmouth College and an MBA with high distinction from Harvard Business School where he was a Baker Scholar.

He is based in Innosight's Singapore office.

Publications

Journal articles

Books

References

American management consultants
Living people
1975 births
Harvard Business School alumni
American expatriates in Singapore
Dartmouth College alumni